Butler Township is one of fourteen townships in Miami County, Indiana, United States. As of the 2010 census, its population was 866 and it contained 396 housing units.

History
Butler Township was organized in 1841.

The Francis Godfroy Cemetery, Wallace Circus and American Circus Corporation Winter Quarters, and Westleigh Farms are listed on the National Register of Historic Places.

Geography

Unincorporated towns
 New Santa Fe at 
 Oakley at 
 Peoria at 
 Santa Fe at 
(This list is based on USGS data and may include former settlements.)

Extinct towns
 Missisinewa at 
(These towns are listed as "historical" by the USGS.)

Cemeteries

The township contains these six cemeteries: Clayton, Fegley, Francis Godfroy, Keyes, New Hope and Ramer.

Major highways
  Indiana State Road 19

Lakes
 Mississinewa Lake

School districts
 Maconaquah School Corporation

Political districts
 Indiana's 5th congressional district
 State House District 32
 State Senate District 18

References
 
 United States Census Bureau 2008 TIGER/Line Shapefiles
 IndianaMap

External links
 City-Data.com page for Butler Township

Townships in Miami County, Indiana
Townships in Indiana